Vysoky is a rural inhabited locality under the administrative jurisdiction of the town of Olenegorsk, Murmansk Oblast, Russia.  It is located beyond the Arctic Circle, on the Kola Peninsula.

References

Rural localities in Murmansk Oblast